Transparent Things is an album by Fujiya & Miyagi released in 2006. It was re-released in the United States in 2007 with different artwork and the bonus track "Reeboks in Heaven".

The title of the album comes from Vladimir Nabokov's 1972 novel of the same name.

Track listing
 "Ankle Injuries" – 5:04
 "Collarbone" – 4:03
 "Photocopier" – 4:05
 "Conductor 71" – 4:09
 "Transparent Things" – 2:55
 "Sucker Punch" – 2:40
 "In One Ear & Out the Other" – 3:43
 "Cassettesingle" – 6:31
 "Cylinders" – 3:12
 "Reeboks in Heaven" (U.S. Bonus Track) – 2:22

External links
Tirk Recordings' Transparent Things page

Fujiya & Miyagi albums
2006 albums